Sir Tobias Bridge fought for Parliament in the English Civil War, and served the Lord Protector Oliver Cromwell during the Interregnum. After the Restoration, he served King Charles II.

During the English Civil War, Bridge fought for Parliament under Fairfax. During the Interregnum, he was an active supporter of Oliver Cromwell served on several influential committees. From 1655 and 1659, he was a Colonel of Horse, and on the death of Charles Worsley, he succeeded to the governorship of Cheshire, Lancashire and Staffordshire district during the second half of 1656 Rule of the Major-Generals.

During the Second Commonwealth, in the immediate prelude to the restoration of the monarchy, he served as a major in Sir Lord Lockhart's Regiment of Horse at Dunkirk, and after the restoration, he was appointed Captain of Horse at Dunkirk, a post where he took direct orders from the Governor of Dunkirk and King Charles II. He held the post until 1662 when Dunkirk was sold to France. On his return from Dunkirk, he was commissioned into the Duke of Richmond's Regiment as a captain.

A year after he was knighted in 1666, Bridge went to Barbados as colonel of his regiment. In 1673, he commanded the local land forces against the Baron of Tobago in one of the many wars over that island. In 1674, he was admitted to the council of Barbados. He probably died in Bridgetown, a town named after him and the capital of Barbados.

Notes

References 
 Pape, Thomas (1938). Newcastle-under-Lyme in Tudor and early Stuart times, Manchester university press ([Manchester]).

Further reading 
 

English generals
Parliamentarian military personnel of the English Civil War
Year of death unknown
Colony of Barbados people
Year of birth unknown
Soldiers of the Tangier Garrison